Hannes Walter (3 December 1952 Tallinn – 26 November 2004) was an Estonian war historian.

In 1978 he graduated from Tartu University with a degree in history. In 2000, he received his PhD in cultural history from Tallinn University.

He was head of the Estonian History Museum's Maarjamäe branch. From 1997 to 2001 he worked as a ministerial advisor at the Estonian Defence Ministry. He became head of the Estonian War Museum in 2001, and held this position until his death in 2004.

Works
 Ausalt ja avameelselt Landeswehri sõjast, Võnnu lahingust, Riia operatsioonist (1989)
 Ausalt & avameelselt Eesti suurmeestest (1990) 
 Estonian Orders and Decorations (1998)
 They followed the orders. Faith of the Estonian officers (1999) 
 General Johan laidoner. 115 years since born (1999) 
 Leaders of the 2 World Wars, Part I (2000) co-author 
 Leaders of the 2 World Wars, Part II (2000) co-author 
 Leaders of the 2 World Wars, Part III (2000) co-author 
 Vabadussõja kõrgemate juhtide memoriaali avamine Tallinna Kaitseväe kalmistul 28. novembril 2000. a. (2000) 
 They gave everything. The officers who fell in the War of Liberation (2002) 
 Hundred years of War (2002) 
 Naval battles on the Baltic Sea 1918–1919. The British and Estonian Navy in the War of Liberation (2003) 
 The Estonian State decorations (2003) 
 Jüriööst teisiti (2004)

Articles
 Detsembrimäss oli Eesti huvides: 75 aasta tagune detsembrimäss Eestis oli Nõukogude Liidu globaalse agressiooni tüüpiline episood (1999) article
 Salaluure Eesti Vabariigi sündimise ajal. Luuramisi. (1999) article
 Husaar (2001) article
 About "The Holocaust Industry" (2002) 
 28. juulil 1914 algas 20. sajand (2004)

Walters legacy
 Tagasi Euroopasse (1989) film script
 Kaks rahvast-üks meri (1990) film script

References

1952 births
2004 deaths
20th-century Estonian historians
21st-century Estonian historians
University of Tartu alumni
Tallinn University alumni
Writers from Tallinn
People from Tallinn